The Hunting of the President is a 2004 English-language documentary film about former US President Bill Clinton. Clinton and his wife Hillary Clinton appear in archived footage.  The film is based on the book The Hunting of the President: The Ten Year Campaign to Destroy Bill and Hillary Clinton, written by investigative journalists Joe Conason and Gene Lyons, and published by Thomas Dunne Books in 2000.  Narrated by Morgan Freeman, the film premiered at the 2004 Sundance Film Festival.

The book and movie explore Clinton friends Jim and Susan McDougal, former Associate Attorney General Webster Hubbell, and Arkansas Governor Jim Guy Tucker. Interviewed for the book and movie, Susan McDougal discusses legal threats from the independent counsel to pressure her to implicate the Clintons in something illegal. She told the independent counsel the Clintons did nothing wrong, and the independent counsel said they had statements prepared and she simply had to agree with the pre-written claims.

The film was nominated for Best Documentary Screenplay from the Writers Guild of America.

Book
Conason, Joe, and Lyons, Gene, The Hunting of the President, ©2000 Thomas Dunne Books. 

See also
Arkansas Project
Troopergate (Bill Clinton)
Vast right-wing conspiracy
Whitewater controversy

References

External links

2004 films
2004 documentary films
Books about the Clinton administration
Documentary films about American politicians
Books about Bill Clinton
Films about Bill Clinton
Books about Hillary Clinton
Works about Hillary Clinton
2000s English-language films
Films directed by Nickolas Perry
Films directed by Harry Thomason
2000s American films
Whitewater controversy